Jean Lapointe,  (December 6, 1935 – November 18, 2022) was a Canadian actor, comedian and singer as well as a Canadian Senator.

Lapointe began his stage career as part of the duo Les Jérolas with Jérôme Lemay, performing in such venues as The Ed Sullivan Show and at the Olympia in Paris.

He launched his solo career in 1974 and performed on stage, albums and in two feature films. Most of his albums have been produced by Yves Lapierre.

He was also a social activist who campaigned against alcoholism and drug abuse through his Jean Lapointe Foundation. He was named an Officer of the Order of Canada in 1984 and was named to the Senate by Jean Chrétien in 2001 where he sat as a Liberal until reaching the mandatory retirement age of 75 on December 6, 2010. In 2006, he was made an Officer of the National Order of Quebec.

Lapointe was also a life member of the Royal Philatelic Society of Canada and a member of the Stamp Advisory Committee of Canada Post.

In 2005, Lapointe was the recipient of the Lifetime Achievement Award at the Francophone SOCAN Awards held in Montreal.

Lapointe died on November 18, 2022, at the age of 86.

Thoroughbred racing
Jean Lapointe owned the sprinter Diapason whose wins included the 1984 Nearctic Stakes and who was voted the Sovereign Award as that year's Canadian Champion Sprint Horse.

Filmography

References

External links 
 
 
 

1935 births
2022 deaths
Liberal Party of Canada senators
Canadian male film actors
Canadian male stage actors
Singers from Quebec
Canadian racehorse owners and breeders
Best Supporting Actor Genie and Canadian Screen Award winners
Canadian senators from Quebec
Officers of the Order of Canada
Officers of the National Order of Quebec
Male actors from Quebec
French Quebecers
French-language singers of Canada
21st-century Canadian politicians
Best Supporting Actor Jutra and Iris Award winners